In neuroanatomy, the marginal sulcus (margin of the cingulate sulcus) is a sulcus (crevice) that may be considered the termination of the cingulate sulcus. It separates the paracentral lobule anteriorly and the precuneus posteriorly.

Additional images

References

External links

 https://web.archive.org/web/20070416083824/http://www.med.harvard.edu/AANLIB/cases/case3/mr1/033.html

Parietal lobe
Sulci (neuroanatomy)